Lux Æterna (stylized as LVX ÆTERNA) is a 2019 French independent experimental meta-art film written, produced and directed by Gaspar Noé. The piece heavily employs epileptic imagery through grey and color strobes, split-screen, and uses of 1920s-esque documentary footage involving witchcraft and torture. It was screened out of competition at the 2019 Cannes Film Festival.

Plot 
The film is preceded in screenings by The Art of Filmmaking, a 15 minute montage of Cecil B. DeMille films narrated over with a hypnotic suggestion to relax alongside droning orchestration. The montage strobes through red, green and blue colorgrades of itself in rapid succession. The final clip, showing the crucifixion scene from The King of Kings, strobes in black and white.

Lux Æterna begins with a short montage of 1920's style documentary footage of witch torture, which abruptly cuts to actresses Charlotte Gainsbourg and Béatrice Dalle playing fictional versions of themselves. About to shoot a film, God's Craft, about witches burnt at the stake, the two actresses sit down in one of the sets and discuss the cinematic depiction of witches, the way women are treated on film sets, and anecdotes from their own film shoots.

The women are joined by a producer and assistant, who escort Gainsbourg to her dressing room while Dalle leaves to conduct directorial duties. In split screen, Gainsbourg and her co-stars are seen getting make-up and costuming done while a myriad of complications occur behind the scenes. Of the two other actresses playing witches burnt at the stake, one only speaks English and is upset when her outfit is shown to reveal her breasts. Dalle, upset with the entire production team waiting for five hours to shoot one scene, argues with the director of photography to get the actors some rehearsal time while they wait.

The director of photography, who has been promised the role of director after Dalle is fired, refuses to do anything that she asks while the producers spend their time spying on Dalle to catch any slip-ups they can report to get her fired. A behind-the-scenes cameraman is also seen capturing unflattering moments of the production crew while friends of the crew appear on set and try to make conversation with Gainsbourg and the other actresses. Throughout the entirety of Lux Æterna, quotations from filmmakers Luis Buñuel, Carl Theodor Dreyer and Rainer Werner Fassbinder on a director's desire for absolute control are shown on screen.

The production continues to break down once the filming of the witch-burning scene begins. The director of photography increasingly demands that the camera run for longer and that the actresses never budge. Midway through shooting, the rear projection screen malfunctions and begins to show the same red, green and blue strobing from The Art of Filmmaking, this time as solid colours. Music playback also malfunctions, instead playing an extremely loud droning sound. While Dalle frantically tries to get the projectionist and sound mixers to fix the problem, the director of photography insists that he is still filming and barks orders at his crew, namely at Gainsbourg to continue acting as if she is on fire and to weep for him.

The other actresses are able to break free of their bonds and leave Gainsbourg, who is unable to break her bonds, on set alone. Dalle tearfully laments why no-one else is there to help as only she, Gainsbourg and the director of photography remain. Gainsbourg's silhouette dissolves into the strobing colours and the pole she was tied to transforms into a Christian cross. After the credits, one final Buñuel quotation appears: "Thank God I'm an Atheist."

Cast
Most of the film's cast portray fictionalized versions of themselves:

Production

Release
The film had its world premiere at the Cannes Film Festival on 18 May 2019. It was set to screen at the Tribeca Film Festival in April 2020; however, the festival was cancelled due to the COVID-19 pandemic. It was released in France on 23 September 2020 by UFO Distribution and Potemkine Films.

Yellow Veil Pictures distributes its US rights to release the film in the United States and Canada in May 2022.

Reception
The review aggregator website Rotten Tomatoes calculated a 63% approval rating from 56 reviews, with an average rating of 5.9/10. The website's consensus reads, "Stylish but hollow, Lux Æterna represents a frustrating regression for writer-director Gaspar Noé."

References

External links
 

2019 films
2019 drama films
2019 thriller films
2019 thriller drama films
2010s psychological drama films
2010s psychological thriller films
2010s French-language films
French drama films
Films directed by Gaspar Noé
Films about actors
Epilepsy
Psychedelic art
2010s French films
Metafictional works